Young Man Kang (born April 6, 1966 in South Chungcheong, South Korea) is a Korean filmmaker based in Los Angeles, California, United States. Kang directed and produced The Last Eve (2005), Soap Girl (2002), Cupid's Mistake (2001) and Kimchi Warrior (2009).  He is the director and founder of Seoul Webfest.

Early life
Young Man Kang studied fine arts at Hong-ik University in Seoul, Korea. In 1994, Kang moved to New York City where he studied film at the New School. In 1996, Kang moved to Los Angeles and began his film career working as a director for a television commercial production company.

Career
Between 2000 and 2010, Kang directed five feature films. His feature debut, Cupid's Mistake, was made with a budget of $980 USD and held screenings in Los Angeles and New York City.  Cupid's Mistake's low budget earned Kang a Guinness World Records award for the lowest film budget on record.

In 2013, Kang premiered the documentary Innocence Abandoned: Street Kids of Haiti at the Monaco Charity Film Festival.

Kang created the animated web drama Kimchi Warrior in 2009 to help promote kimchi and taekwondo in entertainment.  The animation uses a mix of 2D animation with Flash, Photoshop, and After Effects and includes a character designed by Christopher Nadolski.  Kimchi Warrior won several awards at the Los Angeles Web Series Festival including Best Animation and Best Score.

In 2019, Kang released the web series Lotte Haus with the support of the Wetzlar Lotte House in Germany and the Lotte World Tower in Seoul, South Korea.  Lotte House is based on Johann Wolfgang von Goethe’s first novel, “The Sorrows of Young Werther”.  Lotte Haus won the award for Best Branded Series at the British Web Awards in 2020 as well as several others at various festivals.

Kang's production company, YMK Films, is located in Los Angeles, California.

Seoul Webfest
Kang founded Seoul Webfest (formerly known as Kweb Fest) in July 2015.  It takes place yearly in South Korea and is the first web series festival in Korea & Northeast Asia.  The event was created as a result of the popularity of web series in Korea. Each year, Seoul Webfest chooses between 100 to 150 web series to screen and offers 30 to 40 awards.  Additionally, the festival features panels, question and answer sessions, technology exhibitions, and tours.

The event was formally sponsored by the South Korean Ministry of Culture, Sports and Tourism.

Filmography
 Lotte Haus - Director, Producer 2019
 Beyond the Border - Director, Producer, Writer (screenplay), Cinematographer, Editor 2009
 Haitian Street Kids Revisited - Director, Producer 2009
 Kimchi Warrior - Director, Producer, Writer, 2009
 Mad Cowgirl - Dirty Ho (as actor) 2006
 Koreatown - Producer 	 2006
 The Last Eve - Director, Producer, Writer, Cinematographer 	 2005
 Until the Night - Reporter 	 2004
 Death Valley Diary - Director, Producer, Writer, 2003
 Soap Girl - Director, Editor 	 2002
 Secret of the Five Fingers (video) - Cinematographer 2002
 Cupid's Mistake - Director, Producer, Writer, Young 	 2001
 1st Testament CIA Vengeance - Director, Producer, Korean Peace Preservation Agent, Editor 	 2001
 America So Beautiful - Storyboard Artist 	 2001
 Haitian Slave Children (documentary short) - Director, Cinematographer, Editor 2001
 Images of Korea (short) - Director, Writer 2000
 Desire L.A. (short) - Director, Producer 2000
 Rocket's Red Glare - Storyboard Artist 	 2000
 Toilet Lesson (short) - Director, Producer, Writer 	 2000
 The Mao Game - Storyboard Artist 	 1999
 Death of Sunflower - Director, Writer 	 1999

As Himself
''KBS Korean Report; Young Man Kang Goes to Hollywood (documentary, 2004)

Awards and honors

Won
New York International Independent Film and Video Festival:
Best Action Feature Film Award (The Last Eve)
New York B Movie Film Festival:
Best Cinematography (The Last Eve)
Big Bear Lake International Film Festival:
Audience Award (Soap Girl)
WorldFest Houston:
Silver Award (Haitian Slave Children)
Jamerican International Film Festival:
Best Effort (Haitian Slave Children)
New York B Movie Film Festival:
Killer B Award (1st Testament CIA Vengeance)
Special Achievement (1st Testament CIA Vengeance)

See also
List of Korean film directors
Cinema of Korea

References

External links

YMK Films

1966 births
Living people
South Korean film directors
American film directors of Korean descent
Hongik University alumni
People from Seosan